Knighton Heath is an area of Bournemouth, Dorset in England. Knighton Heath is south of Bearwood, west of Wallisdown and West Howe, and north of Alderney.

Facilities 
Knighton Heath is home to a golf club, an industrial estate and Bournemouth Water. In May 2020, the golf course was set on fire.

Politics 
Knighton Heath is part of the Bournemouth West parliamentary constituency.

References

External links 

 Knighton Heath Industrial Estate

Areas of Bournemouth
Heaths of the United Kingdom